The Bausman mine was a 19th-century coal mine in the Pittsburgh area. The mine was started in 1844 by Frederick Bausman, and ran underground from 12th Street in Birmingham, Pennsylvania (modern South Side, Pittsburgh) to Spiketown. Coal from other mines in Spiketown was transferred through this mine using a steam locomotive.

Bausman's Rhinoceros
The "rhinoceros" was an early steam locomotive used in the Bausman mine. It was a  steam locomotive built for a narrow-gauge railway of an unusual design. The original builder is unknown. It was rebuilt by Thatcher Perkins of the Pittsburgh Locomotive Works in 1867. The locomotive was designed with an unusual driving mechanism in order to minimize the vertical forces of the wheels on the iron tracks.

References

Bibliography
 
 
 
 
 

History of Allegheny County, Pennsylvania
Pittsburgh metropolitan area
Companies based in Allegheny County, Pennsylvania
Coal companies of the United States
Defunct mining companies of the United States
History of Pittsburgh
Narrow gauge railroads in Pennsylvania
Underground mines in the United States
Defunct companies based in Pennsylvania
Mines in Pennsylvania
3 ft gauge railways in the United States